Henry Read Emmerson (November 7, 1883 – June 21, 1954) was a Canadian business executive, salesman, and politician.

Born in Dorchester, New Brunswick, the son of Henry Robert Emmerson and Emily Charlotte Record, he was defeated twice when he ran for the House of Commons of Canada as the Liberal candidate in the 1926 and 1930 federal elections for the riding of Westmorland. He was elected in the 1935 election and re-elected twice in 1940 and 1945. In 1949, he was appointed to the Senate of Canada representing the senatorial division of Dorchester, New Brunswick. He died in office in 1954.

Electoral record

External links 
 

1883 births
1954 deaths
Businesspeople from New Brunswick
Canadian senators from New Brunswick
Liberal Party of Canada MPs
Members of the House of Commons of Canada from New Brunswick
People from Westmorland County, New Brunswick